The Austrian Social Service (Österreichischer Sozialdienst) is part of the Austrian Service Abroad founded by Dr. Andreas Maislinger in 1998. It offers the possibility to substitute the compulsory military service in Austria with a 10-months service abroad and provides a platform for volunteering services.

Legal Framework
As part of the Austrian Service Abroad the Austrian Social Service is funded and supervised by the Austrian Ministry of Social Affairs and subject to the federal law for the promotion of voluntary engagement (Bundesgesetz zur Förderung von freiwilligem Engagement.)

Mission and structure
The Austrian Social Service supports socially vulnerable groups and the social and economic development of the host country. Austrian Social Servants are deployed in various kinds of partner organizations in a large number of countries. The focus lies on the developing world.

Assignments
The Austrian Social Servants work in the fields of education, care, medical support, agriculture and economic development for street or homeless children, elderly, handicapped, ill, poor and / or marginalized people. Furthermore, also the field of environmental protection belongs to the Austrian Social Service, partnering with organizations engaged in projects for the protection and sustenance of the natural environment.

Since 2018 the Austrian Service Abroad also partakes in the program Understanding Israel, sending young Austrians to do social service at child-care places and handicapped-care facilities in the state of Israel in cooperation with the Israeli Volunteer Association.

Partners
 Argentina
 Buenos Aires - Center for homeless children and adolescents

 Belgium
Brussels - European Disability Forum

 Bosnia and Herzegovina
Sarajevo - Phoenix Initiative

 Brasil
Alagoinhas - Associacao Lar Sao Benedito
Lauro de Freitas - Community Centre Christ Liberator
Rio de Janeiro - Center for Justice and International Law (CEJIL)

 China
 Qiqihar - China SOS Children's Village Association Beijing, Qiqihar city, Helongjiang Province und Yantai City, Shandong Province

 Costa Rica
 La Gamba - Tropical Field Station La Gamba
 Puntarenas - Finca Sonador - Asociaicón de Cooperativas Europeas Longo Mai
 Puntarenas - Union de Amigos para la Protección del Ambiente (Unaproa)
 San Isidro - Asociación Vida Nueva

 Germany
 Marburg - Terra Tech

 England
London - Royal London Society for the Blind

 Gabon
Lambaréné - Medical Research Unit, Albert Schweitzer Hospital

 Guatemala
 Quetzaltenango - Instituto de Formacion e Investigacion Municipal,
 Santa Rosita - Casa Hogar Estudiantil ASOL

 India
 Auroville - Auroville Action Group (AVAG)
Dharmshala -  Nishtha,  Nishtha - Rural Health, Education and Environment Centre
  Dharmshala - Tibetan Children's Village:*Dharmshala - Tibetan Welfare Office
Kerala - Mata Amritanandamayi Mission

 Israel
Jerusalem - St. Vinzenz-Ein Karem
Understanding Israel

 Kenya
Nairobi - Kenya Water for Health Organisation (KWAHO)

 Nicaragua
Granada - Fundación Casa de los tres mundos
León - Campo Recreativo MILAVF

 Norway
Oslo - Jodisk Aldersbolig

 Pakistan
 SOS children villages Pakistan Karachi, Sialkot, Dodhial, Faisalabad, Sargodha, Lahore, Rawalpindi und Multan

 Peru
Huancayo - Unidad Territorial de Salud Daniel Alcides Carrión
Lima - The information and education centre for the prevention of drug abuse (CEDRO)

 Poland
Kraków -  Polska Akcja Humanitarna

 Romania
Iaşi - The hope of Romanian children

 Russia
Moscow - Together For Peace (TFP)
Moscow - Centre for social development and self-help "perspective"

 Czech Republic
Prague - Jüdische Gemeinde

 Uganda
Fort Portal - Mountains of the Moon University (MMU)
 Kabale - Diözese Kabale - Bishops House

 United States
New York - Gay Men's Health Crisis

 Belarus
Minsk - Belarusian Children's Hospice
Minsk - 'Dietski dom no. 6' - Kinderheim no.6
Minsk -  Kindergarten for Children with Special Needs

References

External links
 http://www.sozialdienst.at
 http://www.auslandsdienst.at

Non-profit organisations based in Austria
Braunau am Inn